Gol Bestan (also Romanized as Gol Bestān) is a village in Peyrajeh Rural District, in the Central District of Neka County, Mazandaran Province, Iran. At the 2006 census, its population was 2,462, in 597 families.

References 

Populated places in Neka County